Very Cavallari is an American reality television series that premiered on July 8, 2018, on E!. The series follows Kristin Cavallari and her life in Nashville, Tennessee, with her then-husband Jay Cutler, as she launches the flagship store for her jewelry line, Uncommon James.

Production
Very Cavallari was announced in April 2018. The series is set in Nashville, Tennessee. The series premiered on July 8, 2018. On August 23, 2018, it was announced that Very Cavallari was renewed for a 10-episode second season. On May 3, 2019, the series was renewed for a third season that premiered on January 9, 2020. On November 4, 2019, it was announced that a holiday special titled A Very Merry Cavallari would premiere on December 15, 2019.

On May 19, 2020, Cavallari announced that she would not continue doing the show, effectively ending it after three seasons.

Cast
Kristin Cavallari
Jay Cutler
Kelly Henderson (seasons 1–2; guest, season 3)
Brittainy Taylor
Reagan Agee (seasons 1–2)
Justin Anderson
Austin Rhodes
Colby Dee Coskery
Wirth Campbell
Shannon Ford (seasons 1–2)
John Gurney (seasons 1–2)
Taylor Monaco (seasons 1–2)

Episodes

Season 1 (2018)

Season 2 (2019)

Season 3 (2019–20)

References

External links
 

2018 American television series debuts
2010s American reality television series
2020s American reality television series
2020 American television series endings
E! original programming
Television shows set in Tennessee